On October 13, 1821, before the first meeting of the 17th Congress, Wingfield Bullock (DR) of  died.  A special election was held to fill the resulting vacancy.

Election result

Breckinridge took his seat on January 2, 1822, a month into the 1st Session of the 17th Congress.

See also
List of special elections to the United States House of Representatives

References

8th congressional district special election
Kentucky 08
1821 08
Kentucky 1821 08
Kentucky 1821 08
United States House of Representatives 1821 08